Shane Carter may refer to:

Shane Carter (musician) with Hall & Oates
Shayne Carter, "Da Pain", New Zealand singer/songwriter